The Mixed team normal hill event of the FIS Nordic World Ski Championships 2015 was held on 22 February 2015.

Results
The first round was started at 17:02 and the second round at 18:14.

References

Mixed team normal hill